A medical aspirator is a suction machine used to remove mucus, blood, and other bodily fluids from a patient. They can be used during surgical procedures but an operating theater is generally equipped with a central system of vacuum tubes. Most aspirators are therefore portable, for use in ambulances and nursing homes, and can run on AC/DC or battery power. They consist of a vacuum pump, a
vacuum regulator and gauge, a collection canister, and sometimes a
bacterial filter. Plastic tubing is used to continuously draw fluid into the collection canister.

In the past manually operated aspirators were used such as Potain's aspirator.

See also 
 Suction (medicine)

References

Medical equipment